Ghazala Kaifee (née Najam) is a Pakistani actress. She is known for her roles in dramas Laikin, Qissa Meherbano Ka, Rasam, Ishq E Laa and Sinf-e-Aahan.

Early life
Ghazala was born in 1960 on 17th April in Karachi, Pakistan. She completed her studies from University of Karachi.

Career
Ghazala started acting on PTV in 1976. She was encouraged by Qasim Jalil to pursue a television career and Fatima Surayya Bajia cast her in dramas. She was noted for her roles in dramas Shama, Tipu Sultan: The Tiger Lord, Ana, Hawain, Aroosa and Brahim Ki Talaash. She also appeared in dramas Yeh Bhi Kisi Ki Bayti Hai, Janay Kyun, Chain Aye Na, Rasam, Rishtay Mohabbaton Kay and Laikin. Ghazala also appeared in movie Article 370 as Mir's mother. Since then she appeared in dramas Ishq E Laa, Qissa Meherbano Ka and Sinf-e-Aahan.

Personal life
Ghazala is married and has four children including three sons and one daughter and her youngest son named Hassan Kaifee is a reporter. Ghazala also set up a foundation called Foundation of Youth to help the poor. She and her husband were diagnosed with COVID-19 during the COVID-19 pandemic in Pakistan and went into quarantine then she and her husband recovered from coronavirus in June 23rd on 2020.

Filmography

Television

Telefilm

Film

Awards and nominations

References

External links
 
 

1960 births
Living people
20th-century Pakistani actresses
Pakistani television actresses
21st-century Pakistani actresses
Pakistani film actresses